John Cordell may refer to:

Sir John Cordell, 2nd Baronet (1646–1690), MP for Sudbury and Suffolk
Sir John Cordell, 3rd Baronet (1677–1704), MP for Sudbury

See also
Cordell (surname)